The 2004 All-Ireland Senior Camogie Championship—known as the Foras na Gaeilge All-Ireland Senior Camogie Championship for sponsorship reasons—was the high point of the 2004 season, the centenary year for the sport of camogie. The championship was won by Tipperary who defeated Cork by an eight-point margin in the final. The attendance was a then record of 24,567.

Group stages
Antrim staged their match with Kilkenny in Cushendall as part of the Glens Feis who were also celebrating their centenary in 2004. Cork had beaten Tipperary by 3-7 to 1-6 in the group stages of the National Camogie League.

Semi-finals
As part of the centenary celebrations the two semi-finals were televised live by RTÉ for the first time. Cork beating Galway by 3-9 to 1-4 and Tipperary overcoming a strong Wexford challenge with a two-point win thanks to a goal from Deirdre Hughes. Because of illness team captain Joanne Ryan was not named in the starting line-up for the semi-final clash with Wexford but came off the bench.

Final
A goal from Deirdre Hughes in the 19th minute, when she availed of a mix-up in the Cork defence to score into an empty net kept Tipperary on course for a fifth title in six years as Una O'Dwyer maintained her absolute control at the heart of their defence. Tipperary were denied a goal when Eimear McDonnell’s ninth minute penalty was stopped by Cork ’keeper Aoife Murray. Hughes’s goal was quickly followed by two pointed frees from Grogan, and gave Tipp an important psychological boost and a half time lead of 1-6 to 0-4 and when Joanne Ryan’s persistent efforts were rewarded with a goal in the 43rd minute, Tipperary gained even more in confidence.

Aftermath
Raymie Ryan retired as Tipperary manager the following November having guided the Tipperary team to two successive All-Ireland victories, two Munster championship titles, and their first National League title since 1977.

Final stages

References

External links

2004
2004
All-Ireland Senior Camogie Championship